Ramon "Nito" Duterte Durano III is a Filipino politician from Danao, Cebu, Philippines. He currently serves as the mayor of Danao. Durano previously served as vice mayor along with his brother, former mayor Ramon "Boy" Durano, Jr.

Durano is the cousin of Rodrigo Duterte.

References

21st-century Filipino politicians
Living people
Year of birth missing (living people)
Duterte family